Eye Filmmuseum is a film archive, museum, and cinema in Amsterdam that preserves and presents both Dutch and foreign films screened in the Netherlands.

Location and history

Eye Filmmuseum is located in the Overhoeks neighborhood of Amsterdam in the Netherlands. Its predecessor was the Dutch Historical Film Archive, founded in 1946 by David van Staveren, Felix Halverstad, and directors of Filmtheater Kriterion Piet Meerburg and Paul Kijzer. Following the accession of the archives of the Filmtheater de Uitkijk, the archive was renamed the Netherlands Filmmuseum under the leadership of its first director, film collector Jan de Vaal. The Filmmuseum was located in Kriterion and Stedelijk Museum until 1975, when de Vaal succeeded in acquiring a discrete space for the Filmmuseum in the Vondelpark Pavilion. In 2009, Nederlands Filmmuseum merged with Holland Film, the Netherlands Institute for Film Education and the Filmbank and plans were announced for a new home on the north bank of Amsterdam's waterfront. The Filmmuseum was renamed the Eye Film Institute Netherlands and was officially opened on April 4, 2012, by Queen Beatrix.

Buildings

Eye Filmmuseum 
The Eye Filmmuseum building is designed by Delugan Meissl Associated Architects, whose other projects include the Porsche Museum in Stuttgart. The building features two gallery exhibition spaces, one 300-seat cinema, two 127-seat cinemas, and a fourth intimate cinema of about 67 seats. One of the gallery spaces is devoted to a permanent exhibition on the technical and aesthetic histories of cinema. The exhibit includes historical equipment drawn from the Museum's collection of approximately 1,500 cinematic apparatuses, as well as an immersive presentation of about one hundred film clips from the Museum's archive, including Dutch and international films dating from the silent era and beyond. The second gallery space is dedicated to experimental cinema or expanded cinema, a commitment which dates back to the Filmmuseum's founding and the weekly screenings it organized at the Stedelijk Museum in the 1950s under the emerging aegis of cinema as a "seventh art." Past exhibitions in this space have focused on auteurs and cinematographers, as well as video artists and visual artists like Ryoji Ikeda and Anthony McCall.

Eye Collection Center 
Eye opened its revamped Collection Center in 2016. The collection is made up of analog, digitized, and born-digital materials which are situated beside a sound restoration and digitization studio, a digital image restoration studio, and a grading and scanning suite. The collection includes 210,000 cans of acetate film, 57,000 film titles,  2.5 petabytes of digital data, 82,000 posters, 700,000 photographs, 27,000 books, 2,000 journals, 1,500 pre-cinema and film apparatuses, 4,500 magic lantern slides, 7,000 musical scores, and 250,000 press cuttings.  
The collection originally consisted of films from the Uitkijk archive, compiled by members of the Dutch Filmliga (1927-1933). After joining the International Federation of Film archives (FIAF) in 1947, the Filmmuseum started to actively collect and preserve Dutch film productions. Since then, a number of significant collections have been acquired, ranging from Dutch distributors (Desmet, Centra, and UIP); filmmakers (Joris Ivens, Johan van der Keuken, and Louis van Gasteren); and producers (Matthijs van Heijningen and Kees Kasander) to institutions and organizations, such as the Netherlands Film Academy; the Netherlands Film Fund; and the Netherlands Institute for Animation Film (NIAf). The collection also includes many seminal silent film works, Hollywood classics, international arthouse productions, and independent filmmakers of international renown.

Nitrate Bunkers 

Eye stores 30,000 cans of flammable nitrate film in bunkers near the coast of North Holland in Overveen, Castricum and Heemskerk. These nitrate films date between 1896 and the mid-1950s and include a unique collection of 68mm film. Two of these bunkers were built during the Second World War to protect Dutch art museum holdings from theft and destruction; Rembrandt's The Night Watch was among a few of the paintings which were stored in the Castricum bunker for part of the war.

Restorations 
Recent silent film Eye restorations include the formerly lost film Beyond the Rocks (1922) starring Gloria Swanson, J'accuse! (1919) by Abel Gance, The Seashell and the Clergyman (1928) by Germain Dulac, Raskolnikov (1923) by Robert Wiene, Flower of Evil (1915) by Carmine Gallone, and Shoes (1916) by Lois Weber.

Restorations of Dutch films include Wan Pipel (1976) by Dutch-Surinamese director Pim de la Parra, Zeemansvrouwen (1930) by Henk Kleinmann, Karakter (1997) by Mike van Diem, Spetters (1980) by Paul Verhoeven, and Abel (1986) by Alex van Warmerdam.

Other restorations include Eve (1962) by Joseph Losey, M (1931) by Fritz Lang, and We Can't Go Home Again (1979) by Nicholas Ray.

Projects
Eye is performing a major film digitization and preservation project together with IBM and Thought Equity Motion, a provider of video platform and rights development services. The project involves scanning and storing more than 150 million discrete DPX files on LTO Gen5 Tape in the Linear Tape File System format.

The institute's youth platform is named MovieZone (previously MovieSquad).

Annual events 

 International Documentary Film Festival Amsterdam (November)
 Eye International Conference (May)

Publications
In 2009, in collaboration with Amsterdam University Press (AUP), Eye began publishing academic books on restoration, preservation, archival and exhibition practices through their "Framing Film" series.

Collection

See also 
 List of film archives
 Association of European Film Archives and Cinematheques
 List of museums in Amsterdam

References

External links 

1952 establishments in the Netherlands
Amsterdam-Noord
Archives in the Netherlands
Cinema museums
Film archives in Europe
Film organisations in the Netherlands
Media museums in the Netherlands
Museums established in 1952
Museums in Amsterdam
Articles containing video clips
FIAF-affiliated institutions
20th-century architecture in the Netherlands